Khoroda is a rural locality (a selo) and the administrative center of Kosobsky Selsoviet, Tlyaratinsky District, Republic of Dagestan, Russia. The population was 279 as of 2010.

Geography 
Khoroda is located 30 km north of Tlyarata (the district's administrative centre) by road. Magitl and Kosob are the nearest rural localities.

References 

Rural localities in Tlyaratinsky District